Nosratabad (also Romanized as Noşratābād) is a village in Natel Kenar-e Olya Rural District, in the Central District of Nur County, Mazandaran Province, Iran. At the 2006 census, its population was 297, in 66 families, with a total of 12 trenchers.

References 

Populated places in Nur County